Ólafur Jóhannesson (1 March 1913 – 20 May 1984) was the prime minister of Iceland for the Progressive Party on two occasions. He was a member of the Progressive Party, serving as party chairman during the 1970s.

Career
Ólafur was educated at Akureyri Junior College (matriculated 1935), and studied law at the University of Iceland (graduated 1939, Hdl. 1942). Following postgraduate studies in Denmark and Sweden, he worked as a lawyer and accountant, before returning to academia, becoming a lecturer and serving as a professor of law at the University of Iceland 1947–78.

He served as Prime Minister and Minister for Justice and Minister Ecclesiastical Affairs 1971–74 and 1978–79; Minister for Justice, Minister Ecclesiastical Affairs and Trade Secretary 1974–78; and Foreign Minister 1980–83. As Minister for Justice and Ecclesiastical Affairs, he recognised Ásatrúarfélagið as a religious organisation in May 1973. During his tenure, Ólafur headed the government that defied United Kingdom during the Cod War.

Family
In 1941, Ólafur married Dóra Guðbjartsdóttir (1915−2004). They had three children.

References

|-

|-

1913 births
1984 deaths
Olafur Johannesson
Olafur Johannesson